The black scimitarbill (Rhinopomastus aterrimus), also known as the black wood hoopoe, is a species of bird in the family Phoeniculidae.

Range
It is found in Angola, Benin, Burkina Faso, Cameroon, Central African Republic, Chad, Republic of the Congo, Democratic Republic of the Congo, Ivory Coast, Eritrea, Ethiopia, Gabon, Gambia, Ghana, Guinea, Guinea-Bissau, Mali, Mauritania, Niger, Nigeria, Senegal, Sierra Leone, Sudan, Togo, and Uganda.

References

black scimitarbill
black scimitarbill
Taxonomy articles created by Polbot